Alfray may refer to:

Alfray, character in Orcs: First Blood
John Alfray (disambiguation)